The following lists events that happened during 1816 in Chile.

Incumbents
Royal Governor of Chile: Francisco Marcó del Pont

Events

Births

Deaths
Date unknown - Vicente Carvallo y Goyeneche (b. 1742)

References 

1810s in the Captaincy General of Chile
Chile
Chile